101 may refer to:

 101 (number), the number
 AD 101, a year in the 2nd century AD
 101 BC, a year in the 2nd century BC

It may also refer to:

Entertainment 
 101 (album), a live album and documentary by Depeche Mode 
 "101" (song), a 1988 song and single by Sheena Easton
 "101", a song on the Girl on Fire album by Alicia Keys
 The 101 Network, former name of Audience, an American pay television channel

Transportation 
 List of highways numbered 101, several roads, including:
 U.S. Route 101, often called "The 101"
 101 series, a commuter multiple unit train introduced in 1958 by Japan National Railways
 TMK 101, a tramcar type which was used in Zagreb, Croatia, from 1951 until December 2008
 McDonnell F-101 Voodoo fighter aircraft
 McDonnell CF-101 Voodoo Canadian variant of the F-101
 Fisher FP-101 kit aircraft

Other uses 
101 (slang), a term used to indicate an introduction to a body of knowledge
101st Airborne Division
Bell 101 modem a late 1950s communications modem
Bill 101 or Law 101, the Charter of the French Language in Québec
Police 101, the single non-emergency number used by all UK territorial police authorities
Taipei 101, the tallest skyscraper in the world from 2004 to 2010
Mendelevium, chemical element with atomic number 101
101 Dalmatians (disambiguation)

See also 
 
 
 IOI (disambiguation) 
 Room 101 (disambiguation)